Klanec is a small village in the Municipality of Komenda in the Upper Carniola region of Slovenia.

The cyclist Tadej Pogačar comes from Klanec.

References

External links 

Klanec on Geopedia

Populated places in the Municipality of Komenda